The Adtranz-CAF EMU (also known as CAF-Train or LAR-Train) is an Electric Multiple Unit (EMU) train that operates on the MTR rapid transit railway system in Hong Kong. There are two variants, one used on the conventional Tung Chung line, and a more luxurious version used on the Airport Express. The vehicle interiors were designed for MTR by Jones Garrard (Tung Chung Line) Line) and Deisgn Triangle (Airport Express), while the vehicle exterior and driver's cab interior were designed in the UK by Design Triangle (the first two modification of these were designed in Spain by ). These two variations are built jointly by Adtranz (acquired by Bombardier Transportation in 2001) and Construcciones y Auxiliar de Ferrocarriles (CAF) and manufactured in Spain in 1996-7.

Details 
The Adtranz–CAF trains initially were formed as 7-car sets up until 2003–2005 when the 8th car was added. They were built and assembled by CAF in Spain while Adtranz contributed control and traction equipment. These trains are equipped with the AEG GEATRAC DASU 6.1 3-level GTO–VVVF inverter.

Tung Chung line stock 
Trains of the Tung Chung line were made up of 7 cars up until 2003, and were increased to 8 cars with the 'W7XX' car added in 2003 when the West Rail line and Nam Cheong station was opened. The total number of cars ordered was 96.

The configuration of a TCL train is (Westbound) V6XX-W6XX-X6XX-Y7XX-W7XX-X7XX-Z8XX-V8XX (Eastbound).

Airport Express stock 
Trains of Airport Express (AEL) were made up of 7 cars up until 2005. The total number of cars ordered was 88. To cope with the extra traffic demand derived from the opening of AsiaWorld–Expo station, an additional 'F2XX' car was added to each train to form a total of 8 cars. However, the 'K4XX' cars function as baggage container cars for bulky baggage checked in via the in-town check-in services at Hong Kong and Kowloon stations.

Configuration of an AEL train is (Westbound) E1XX-F1XX-G1XX-H2XX-F2XX-G2XX-J4XX-K4XX (Eastbound). Except for 'K4XX' cars that have 5 doors on each side, all other cars in AEL have 2 doors on each side and 1 wheelchair space. Each passenger car is mounted with 2 LCD monitors at each end for broadcasting entertainment or tourist television programmes and train announcements, such as next-station broadcasts.

References

MTR rolling stock
CAF multiple units
Adtranz multiple units
1500 V DC multiple units